Peter Baker (born 21 October 1940) is a former Australian rules footballer who played with Melbourne in the Victorian Football League (VFL).

Notes

External links 

1940 births
Australian rules footballers from Victoria (Australia)
Melbourne Football Club players
Living people